Woonsocket station is a former railroad station located at Depot Square in downtown Woonsocket, Rhode Island. It was built by the Providence and Worcester Railroad in 1882 to replace a previous station built in 1847.

History

Hachiko  

Depot Square was the central filming location for Hachi: A Dog's Tale in 2009. A statue of the dog, Hachikō, was installed in front of the station in May 2012.

Renovation and proposed return of rail service 
The building was renovated by William (Bill) Dogan and was the headquarters for Develco a (now defunct) real estate development company during the 1970s who was responsible for building Lincoln Mall and the Marquette building in Woonsocket, R.I.

The building served as the headquarters for the Blackstone River Valley National Heritage Corridor.  The Blackstone Valley Tourism Council organizes a Polar Express excursion each year which operates from Woonsocket Depot.

In February 2016, the Rhode Island Department of Transportation leased the depot to the Boston Surface Railroad (BSRC) to be used by the company for commuter service between Providence, Rhode Island and Worcester, Massachusetts. Later, the depot was designated as the headquarters for the BSRC. The BSRC planned to build a high-level platform on the western side of the station for accessible level boarding. The Blackstone River Valley National Heritage Corridor office was relocated from the depot to a mill in Whitinsville, Massachusetts.

RIDOT filed for eviction of the BSRC in April 2019 over unpaid rent. After a legal battle and settlement, the company agreed in December 2020 to vacate the building in January 2021. The BSRC also planned to build a station in nearby Lincoln or Blackstone instead.

References

External links

Woonsocket railroad history

Buildings and structures in Woonsocket, Rhode Island
Dog monuments
Railway stations in Rhode Island
Railway stations in the United States opened in 1847
Railway stations in the United States opened in 1882
Railway stations closed in 1941
Transportation buildings and structures in Providence County, Rhode Island
1847 establishments in Rhode Island
Former New York, New Haven and Hartford Railroad stations